Chatswood may refer to:

Chatswood, New South Wales
Chatswood Oval, a sports ground
Chatswood railway station
Chatswood, New Zealand

See also
Chatswood West, New South Wales
Epping to Chatswood rail link, New South Wales